This is a list of singles that charted in the top ten of the Billboard Hot 100 during 1996.

Mariah Carey, R. Kelly, LL Cool J, and Whitney Houston each had three top-ten hits in 1996, tying them for the most top-ten hits during the year.

Top-ten singles
Key
 – indicates single's top 10 entry was also its Hot 100 debut

1995 peaks

1997 peaks

See also
1996 in music
List of Hot 100 number-one singles of 1996 (U.S.)
Billboard Year-End Hot 100 singles of 1996

References

General sources

Joel Whitburn Presents the Billboard Hot 100 Charts: The Nineties
Additional information obtained can be verified within Billboard's online archive services and print editions of the magazine.

1996
United States Hot 100 Top 10